UQ Holder! is a Japanese manga series written and illustrated by Ken Akamatsu. It began its serialization in the manga magazine Weekly Shōnen Magazine on August 28, 2013. Its individual chapters have been collected into twenty-eight tankōbon volumes by Kodansha, the first released on December 17, 2013. The story is set in the same universe as Akamatsu's previous work Negima! Magister Negi Magi, but over 70 years later, it follows the adventures of a young boy named Tōta Konoe who is transformed into a vampire by his foster parent Yukihime and joins a secret society composed of immortal beings called UQ Holder.

The series is licensed for English language release in North America by Kodansha USA under the Kodansha Comics imprint, who published the first volume on March 18, 2014. As the series is published in Japan, it is also released simultaneously in English digitally by Crunchyroll. Individual chapters of the series are called stages.

Volumes list

References

UQ Holder!